Princess Hejing of the First Rank (固倫和靜公主; 10 August 1756 – 9 February 1775), was a princess of the Qing dynasty as the seventh daughter of the Emperor Qianlong. Her mother was Consort Ling (posthumously Empress Xiaoyichun).

Life 
The seventh princess was born on 10 August 1756 in the Hall of Five Fortunes in the Old Summer Palace. In 1761, when the Eight Banners army captured the Mongolian Dzungars, the princess' future spouse, Lhawang Dorji, was chosen as her prince consort (额驸; pinyin: efu) and sent to Beijing. Lawang Dorji was the seventh grandson of Kangxi Emperor's daughter, Princess Chunque of the First Rank and Celing, the princess' husband. His father, Chenggunzhabu, participated in military campaigns of Qing and held the title of jasagh.

Marriage 
The princess married Lhawang Dorji in August 1770 at the age of 14 and was bestowed the title "Princess Hejing of the First Rank". The wedding ceremony took place at the Palace of Brightness and Justice in the Old Summer Palace. According to the imperial tradition, only daughters of the empress could be given a title of first ranking princess (gurun). At that time, her mother was an imperial noble consort, serving as de facto empress because she held the highest rank in the imperial harem. Moreover, Princess Hejing was the imperial noble consort's eldest daughter, and the emperor wanted to show his friendship with Lhawang Dorji. Before marriage, the princess had temporarily resided in Xichun Garden in the outskirts of Beijing because her manor hadn't been completely finished. Her residence used to be the mansion of minister Gao Heng, a brother of the Qianlong Emperor's Imperial Noble Consort Huixian. 

The princess travelled to Mongolia after the wedding ceremony. In November 1771, she went to Tamir together with a consort of Chenggunzhab. They planned to return in the spring due to weather conditions in Khalkha. However, the princess died on 9 February 1775.

Ancestry

In popular culture
Portrayed by Wang Herun in the Netflix series Yanxi Palace: Princess Adventures (2019), a sequel to Story of Yanxi Palace (2018).

References 

1756 births
1775 deaths
Qing dynasty princesses
18th-century Chinese women
18th-century Chinese people
Daughters of emperors
People from Beijing